PROGRESS is a German film distributor. It was established in 1950 to handle the release of films produced by DEFA, the state-controlled production outfit of communist East Germany. Since 1989 Progress distributes the entire DEFA film collection.

Since 2019, PROGRESS has been digitizing and making accessible the complete holdings of DEFA as well as a growing number of international collections by other archives which are being made available to the public on a historically curated platform.

History 

PROGRESS was founded on 1 August 1950 as a German–Soviet company. Like DEFA, PROGRESS Film was a monopoly company, and its films were carefully vetted by the regime for their content. PROGRESS took over this role in the early 1950s from Sovexport, a Soviet-controlled company which operated during the period following the Battle of Berlin in 1945 and the Allied Occupation of Germany. Rudolf Bernstein and Georgri Nikolayevich Nikolayev, later director of Soviet film production Lenfilm, were appointed German and Soviet directors.

PROGRESS was the only film distributor in the German Democratic Republic.The repertoire includes more than 12,000 films from nine decades. Almost half of them were feature films and documentaries by DEFA, the only film studio in the GDR:

Actors such as Armin Mueller-Stahl, Manfred Krug, Corinna Harfouch and Ulrich Mühe and filmmakers like cinematographer Joris Ivens and directors such as Konrad Wolf, Heiner Carow and Frank Beyer began their careers in DEFA films.

PROGRESS also distributed foreign film imports, particularly those from other Eastern Bloc countries. In 1950 the company handled the release of the Stalinist epic The Fall of Berlin in East Germany.

After the fall of the Berlin Wall in 1989, PROGRESS—on behalf of the DEFA Foundation—began marketing the entire collection of films that show a now non-existent country. Other collections from the 20th century were added. Many of the former East German films were re-released and became cult classics.

In 2019, Progress was acquired as PROGRESS Film GmbH by LOOKSfilm, based in Halle. Since 1 April 2019, the entire film heritage of the GDR has been made internationally accessible on the platform PROGRESS.film. In addition, PROGRESS evaluates film materials from ministries, parties and authorities as well as other collections on behalf of the federal government. Thus, an increasing number of archive collections are made available to the public on PROGRESS.film.

Collections 
In total, PROGRESS' holdings include 25,000 films and recordings from around the world, from the beginning of the 20th century to the present (as of January 2021).

References

Bibliography
 Sebastian Heiduschke. East German Cinema: DEFA and Film History. Springer 2013

Film distributors of Germany
Companies of East Germany